Rahel Graf (born 1 February 1989) is a Swiss women's footballer, who has 62 appearances for the national team. At club level, she plays for FC Luzern Frauen.

Personal life
Graf grew up in Pfaffnau, Switzerland, and her father is a Lucerne councillor. As of 2016, she lives in Ennetbürgen, and was studying social security.

Career

Domestic
Graf played for LUwin.ch from 2004–2006. She won the Nationalliga A, and won the Swiss Women's Cup three times with them. In 2005, Graf made her first appearance in the UEFA Women's Champions League, in a 5–1 win for LUwin.ch.

In 2008, Graf transferred to German Frauen-Bundesliga team SC Freiburg, before moving to SC Kriens. In 2014, she transferred to FC Luzern Frauen.  She captained FC Luzern as they reached the Swiss Women's Cup semi-final in 2018.

International
Graf has 62 appearances for the Switzerland. She played for Switzerland U-19 at the 2006 UEFA Women's Under-19 Championship. She made her senior debut in 2007. She played for the senior team in 2011 FIFA Women's World Cup qualification matches, and was sent off in the first-leg playoff against Italy. Switzerland lost the match 1–0. She made 19 further appearances for the national team between 2011 and 2013.

Notes

References

External links

Swiss women's footballers
Sportspeople from Lucerne
1989 births
Living people
Women's association footballers not categorized by position
Switzerland women's international footballers
FC Luzern Frauen players
Swiss Women's Super League players
SC Freiburg (women) players
Frauen-Bundesliga players
Swiss expatriate sportspeople in Germany
Expatriate women's footballers in Germany